The office of United States Attorney for the Eastern District of Arkansas came into being with the creation of the district in 1852, and continues to the present day.

List
 Joseph Stillwell (1852)
 James W. McConaughey (1853–1854)
 Lafayette B. Luckie (1856)
 John C. Murray (1856)
 Read Fletcher (1856–1857)
 Charles A. Carroll (1857)
 John M. Harrell (1857–1858)
 Charles E. Jordan (1861)
 S. R. Harrington (1871–1876)
 Charles C. Waters (1876–1885)
 Joseph W. House (1885–1889)
 Charles C. Waters (1889–1893)
 Joseph W. House (1893–1897)
 Jacob Trieber (1897–1900)
 William G. Whipple (1900–1913)
 William H. Martin (1913–1919)
 June P. Wooten (1919–1922)
 Charles F. Cole (1922–1930)
 Wallace Townsend (1930–1934)
 Fred A. Isrig (1934–1939)
 Samuel Rorex (1939–1946)
 James T. Gooch (1946–1953)
 Osro Cobb (1953–1962)
 Robert D. Smith, Jr (1962–1967)
 Woodrow H. McClellan (1967–1968)
 Wilbur H. Dillahunty (1968–1979)
 George W. Proctor (1979–1987)
 Kenneth H. Stoll (1987)
 Charles A. Banks (1987–1993) 
 Paula Casey (1993–2001)
 Harry E. Cummins II (2001–2006
 Tim Griffin (December 2006 to June 2007) (Interim: Appointed but not confirmed by the Senate)
 Jane Duke (2007-2010)
 Christopher R. Thyer (2010–2017)
 J. Cody Hiland (2017–2020)
 Jonathan D. Ross (2021-Present)

References

External links
 

 
1852 establishments in Arkansas